Dario Ivan Khan (born 24 January 1984 in Mozambique) is a Mozambican football defender currently playing for Costa do Sol. Khan is a member of the Mozambique national football team.

Dario Khan joined Egyptian side Ismaily from Sudanese club Al-Hilal in January 2009.

He scored two own goals during the 2010 Africa Cup of Nations, in the group matches against Benin and Egypt.

References

External links

1984 births
Living people
Mozambican footballers
Mozambique international footballers
Association football defenders
Clube Ferroviário de Maputo footballers
Al-Hilal Club (Omdurman) players
Ismaily SC players
Al Kharaitiyat SC players
CD Costa do Sol players
GD Maputo players
Egyptian Premier League players
Qatar Stars League players
Mozambican expatriate footballers
Mozambican expatriate sportspeople in Sudan
Mozambican expatriate sportspeople in Egypt
Mozambican expatriate sportspeople in Qatar
Expatriate footballers in Sudan
Expatriate footballers in Egypt
Expatriate footballers in Qatar
2010 Africa Cup of Nations players
Sportspeople from Maputo
2014 African Nations Championship players
Mozambique A' international footballers